Alvin Mitchell may refer to:

 Alvin Mitchell (defensive back) (born 1943), American football player
 Alvin Mitchell (running back) (born 1964), American football player